Reginald Dwayne Betts is an American poet, legal scholar, educator and prison reform advocate. At age 16 he committed an armed carjacking, was prosecuted as an adult, and sentenced to nine years in prison. He started reading and writing poetry during his incarceration. "A single book, Dudley Randall's The Black Poets, slid under my cell in the hole, introduced me to the poets that had me believing words can be carved into a kind of freedom.”  After his release, Betts earned an M.F.A. in Creative Writing from Warren Wilson College, and a Juris Doctor degree from Yale Law School. He served on President Barack Obama’s Coordinating Council of the Office of Juvenile Justice and Delinquency Prevention. He founded Freedom Reads, an organization that gives incarcerated people access to books. In September 2021, Betts was awarded a MacArthur Fellowship.  He is currently working on a PhD in Law at Yale University.

Early life and imprisonment 
Born in Maryland, Betts was in gifted programs throughout his youth, and in high school was an honors student and class treasurer at Suitland High School in the Washington, D.C. suburb of District Heights, Maryland.

At the age of sixteen, he and a friend carjacked a man who had fallen asleep in his car at the Springfield Mall. Betts was charged as an adult and consequently spent more than eight years in prison (including fourteen months in solitary confinement), where he completed high school and began reading and writing poetry.

Speaking at the NGC Bocas Lit Fest in 2016, he said: "I was in solitary confinement.... You could call out for a book and someone would slide one to you. Frequently, you would not know who gave it to you. Somebody slid The Black Poets edited by Dudley Randall. In that book I read Robert Hayden for the first time, Sonia Sanchez, Lucille Clifton. I saw the poet as not just utilitarian but as serving art. In a poem you can give somebody a whole world. Before that, I had thought of being a writer, writing mostly essays and maybe, one day, a novel. But at that moment I decided to become a poet."

In prison, he was renamed Shahid, meaning "witness".

Education, writing, and activism after prison
After serving an eight-year prison term, Betts found a job working at Karibu Books in Bowie, Maryland. At the store, he was eventually promoted to store manager and founded a book club for African American boys, while attending Prince George's Community College in Largo, Maryland. He later became a teacher of poetry in Washington, DC, and in 2013, he taught in the writing program (WLP) at Emerson College.

Betts is also the national spokesman for the Campaign for Youth Justice, and speaks out for juvenile-justice reform. He also visits detention centers and inner-city schools, and talks to at-risk young people.

In 2012, President Barack Obama announced that Betts had been named a member of the Coordinating Council on Juvenile Justice and Delinquency Prevention.

In 2016, Betts graduated from Yale Law School and passed the Connecticut bar exam. In September 2017, the bar's Examining Committee recommended him for admission, after the bar had rejected his initial application for membership. He is currently working on his Ph.D. in law at Yale.

Awards and fellowships
In 2009, Shahid Reads His Own Palm won the Beatrice Hawley Award for poetry.

In 2010, Betts was awarded a fellowship from the Open Society Foundation.

His memoir, A Question of Freedom, won an NAACP Award for non-fiction.

In 2017, Only Once I Thought About Suicide received the Israel H. Peres Prize for best student comment appearing in the Yale Law Journal.

In 2018 he was chosen to be a writing fellow for PEN America's Writing for Justice Fellowship.

In 2018 he was also awarded a Guggenheim Foundation Fellowship.

Betts was awarded a MacArthur Fellowship in 2021.

Publications 

His poems have been published in literary journals and magazines including Ploughshares, Crab Orchard Review, and Poet Lore.

Bibliography

Poetry

Collections

List of selected poems

Non-fiction

References

External links
 
 

Living people
21st-century American memoirists
African-American poets
Poets from Maryland
University of Maryland, College Park alumni
Warren Wilson College alumni
Yale Law School alumni
American legal writers
Writers from Maryland
Writers from New Haven, Connecticut
21st-century American poets
21st-century African-American people
MacArthur Fellows
Year of birth missing (living people)